Christian Vinck (born 3 September 1975) is a German former professional tennis player.

Vinck reached his highest individual ranking on the ATP Tour on 12 February 2001, when he became World number 101.  He played primarily on the Challenger circuit.

Vinck's best performance in a grand slam event came at Wimbledon in 2000, when he made it to the third round.

Career tour finals

Singles (4 titles)

External links
 
 

1975 births
German male tennis players
Living people
Tennis people from North Rhine-Westphalia